Qassim Abbas Daoud (born April 13, 1949) is an Iraqi scientist and politician. Born in Al Hillah, he graduated from Baghdad University in 1971. He then studied in Britain, earning a doctorate in microbiology and environment in 1982 from the University of Wales. He worked in the United Arab Emirates and at one time was the general secretary of the Iraqi Democratic Movement.

Daoud became a minister of state without portfolio in the Iraqi Interim Government in June 2004. In September 2004 he replaced Muwaffaq al-Rubay'i as national security advisor for the Interim Government.

He was elected to the transitional National Assembly in January 2005 and now serves in the Council of Representatives as a member of the United Iraqi Alliance. He was a member of the committee that drafted the Constitution of Iraq.

Daoud is married and has three kids and 9 grandchildren

References
Pan, Esther (June 2, 2004), IRAQ: The interim government leaders, Council on Foreign Relations web site, accessed June 11, 2006.
Iraqi Interim Government: Announcement Ceremony Press Packet (PDF), Coalition Provisional Authority web site, accessed June 11, 2006.

Members of the Council of Representatives of Iraq
Alumni of the University of Wales
Living people
1949 births
People from Hillah
Iraqi Shia Muslims